Konrad Begg is a Scottish film and television director. He has directed numerous TV shows, most notably BBC's Top Gear.

In 2012 he completed his first feature film, Songs For Amy. The Irish-based film had its European premiere at the Galway Film Fleadh and won the Outstanding Achievement in Filmmaking award at the Newport Beach Film Festival.

Begg also directs commercials through KODE London and Slash Dynamic in Los Angeles.

Career

Film
In 2012 Begg completed his debut feature film, Songs for Amy. It was predominantly set in Kinvara, County Galway, though other scenes were shot in Galway City, Ireland and New York City, United States. The film starred Sean Maguire, Patrick Bergin, and James Cosmo. Songs for Amy is a dark comedy and was inspired by the music scene in the West of Ireland.

Before its cinema release, Songs for Amy was selected for a raft of international film festivals. It won the Outstanding Achievement in Filmmaking award at the Newport Beach Film Festival. It ranked fourth out of the 400 films at the Newport Beach Film Festival, based on the audience ratings. The European premiere of the film was at the Galway Film Fleadh.

Hot Press Magazine praised the film, calling it "The feelgood Irish Hit of the Year." The List magazine said, "This touching romp is so much more than Ireland’s answer to ‘The Hangover’", while the LA Times said that the film was "Taking the cliche out of the love story". The Daily Mirrors film critic David Edwards also praised the film, scoring it four out of five stars and saying "this indie flick was an unexpected treat."

In 2021 Konrad completed the short film ′′Hireth′′ starring Tom Rhys Harries. The film had its premiere at Manns Chinese Theatre in Los Angeles and went on to screen at numerous international festivals garnering several award nominations. 

Begg's second feature film, The Detour, is currently in development.

Recognition
 BAFTA - Television Craft Awards nomination (2012).
 BAFTA Scotland - nomination (2007).
 Newport Beach Film Festival - Outstanding Achievement in Filmmaking (2012).
 Royal Television Society Award (2013).

Filmography

References

Living people
British film directors
British television directors
1972 births
People from Irvine, North Ayrshire
Scottish film directors